Charles J. Irwin (June 9, 1930 – March 12, 2005) was an American Republican Party politician who served in the New Jersey General Assembly from the 9th at-large district from 1968 to April 5, 1971. He had resigned to become the executive director of the New Jersey Office of Consumer Protection.

Born in Brooklyn, New York, he grew up in Jersey City and Bergen County. He first received a bachelor of arts in economics from Syracuse University. He then served in the U.S. Army for two years becoming a captain. Following his military service, Irwin graduated from Harvard Law School receiving a J.D. An attorney by trade, he worked mainly on environmental law.

In 1990, Democratic Governor James Florio appointed Irwin to a seat on the Casino Reinvestment Development Authority. Following his term, returned to practice law. He died on March 12, 2005.

References

1930 births
2005 deaths
Republican Party members of the New Jersey General Assembly
Politicians from Brooklyn
Politicians from Jersey City, New Jersey
Politicians from Union County, New Jersey
People from Mountainside, New Jersey
New Jersey lawyers
Syracuse University alumni
Harvard Law School alumni
United States Army soldiers
20th-century American politicians
20th-century American lawyers